Herman Malchow served as a member of the South Dakota House of Representatives from 1893 to 1894.  He represented Potter County, South Dakota.  Malchow was a resident of Potter County, South Dakota.

External links
Herman Malchow's record in the South Dakota Legislatures Historical Listing

Malchow, Malchow
People from Potter County, South Dakota
Year of birth missing
Year of death missing